The ODEBI League is a French pressure group defending Internet users. Its name, Odebi, is a pun on haut débit, that is, broadband.

The league rose to fame when it opposed the LCEN Internet bill in 2004, then, in 2005 and 2006, the DADVSI bill.

External links
  Official site

Political organizations based in France